The 1905 Major League Baseball season was contested from April 14 through October 14, 1905. The New York Giants and the Philadelphia Athletics were the regular season champions of the National League and American League, respectively. The Giants then defeated the Athletics in the second modern World Series, four games to one.

Standings

American League

National League

Postseason

Bracket

League leaders

Managers

American League

National League

Events
For the first time in Major League history, two teams with over 100 losses played each other, when the Brooklyn Superbas (100 losses) and Boston Beaneaters (100 losses) met in their final series of the season.

 April 26 – Jack McCarthy of the Chicago Cubs is the first fielder to throw out three base runners at home plate, achieving the feat against the Pittsburgh Pirates.

References
ESPN

External links
1905 in baseball history from ThisGreatGame.com
1905 Major League Baseball season schedule at Baseball Reference

 
Major League Baseball seasons